Embryo loss (also known as embryo death or embryo resorption) is the death of an embryo at any stage of its development which in humans, is between the second through eighth week after fertilization. Failed development of an embryo often results in the disintegration and assimilation of its tissue in the uterus. Loss during the stages of prenatal development after organogenesis of the fetus results in the similar process of fetal resorption. Embryo loss often happens without an awareness of pregnancy, and an estimated 40 to 60% of all embryos do not survive.

Fertility clinics
Within fertility clinics embryo loss is associated with a high number of implanted embryos. The keeping of embryos in tanks can also increase risks of loss in instances where technical malfunctions can occur.

See also
 Perinatal death

References

Further reading
 

Pregnancy with abortive outcome
Embryology